Poeh Center (Tewa: "pathway") is a cultural center in the U.S. state of New Mexico. Established by Pojoaque Pueblo, it is devoted to the arts and culture of the Puebloan peoples. The center is located off of U.S. Route 84. Construction started in 1992 with gaming revenue, and was completed in 2003. 

The Poeh Center is widely recognized for its traditional pueblo architecture and building techniques. Built of adobe bricks and local wood products, it also houses the Poeh Museum, the Poeh Arts educational program, the Poeh Tower Gallery, and administrative offices. The Poeh Tower, currently occupied by sculptor Roxanne Swentzell, is the tallest adobe structure in New Mexico. The Poeh Center is the first tribally owned and maintained facility for cultural preservation of northern New Mexico and is compared to a Kiva-type building. It has traditional pueblo elements such as motifs in the interior, ceilings made of wooden beams, horno fireplaces and Pojoaque pottery. Its architecture is a blend of the New Mexico type pueblo architecture resembling some of the religious structures of Chaco Canyon and Mesa Verde.

References

External links
 

Buildings and structures in Santa Fe County, New Mexico